Uccidete il vitello grasso e arrostitelo (internationally released as Kill the Fatted Calf and Roast It) is a 1970 Italian giallo film directed by Salvatore Samperi.

Plot
A young man returns home from his father's funeral, after which he begins to think his brother Cesare and his sister Verde are both plotting to murder him.

Cast 
Marilù Tolo: Verde
Jean Sorel: Cesare Merlo  
Gigi Ballista: Il medico
Maurizio Degli Esposti: Enrico Merlo
Pier Paolo Capponi: Detective

References

External links

1970 films
Giallo films
Films directed by Salvatore Samperi
Films scored by Ennio Morricone
1970s crime thriller films
1970s Italian films